Reverse cholesterol transport is a multi-step process resulting in the net movement of cholesterol from peripheral tissues back to the liver first via entering the lymphatic system, then the bloodstream.

Cholesterol from non-hepatic peripheral tissues is transferred to HDL by the ABCA1 (ATP-binding cassette transporter). Apolipoprotein A1 (ApoA-1), the major protein component of HDL, acts as an acceptor, and the phospholipid component of HDL acts as a sink for the mobilised cholesterol.
The cholesterol is converted to cholesteryl esters by the enzyme LCAT (lecithin-cholesterol acyltransferase).
The cholesteryl esters can be transferred, with the help of CETP (cholesterylester transfer protein) in exchange for triglycerides, to other lipoproteins (such as LDL and VLDL), and these lipoproteins can be taken up by secreting unesterified cholesterol into the bile or by converting cholesterol to bile acids.

Adiponectin induces ABCA1-mediated reverse cholesterol transport from macrophages by activation of PPAR-γ and LXRα/β.

Uptake of HDL2 is mediated by hepatic lipase, a special form of lipoprotein lipase found only in the liver. Hepatic lipase activity is increased by androgens and decreased by estrogens, which may account for higher concentrations of HDL2 in women.

Discoidal (Nascent) HDL:
Initially, HDL is discoidal in shape because it lacks esterified cholesterol but as it keeps accumulating free cholesterol in it, the enzyme LCAT keeps esterifying the free cholesterol. 
When the HDL molecule is cholesterol rich, its shape is changed into more spherical and it becomes less dense (HDL 2). This is carried to the liver to release all the esterified cholesterol into the liver.

References

Biochemistry
Lipids
Lipoproteins
Metabolism